Anatole Bertrand Abang (born 6 July 1996) is a Cameroonian professional footballer who plays as a forward for Al Bataeh Club.

Early life
Abang was born in Yaoundé, and started his career with local side AS Fortuna de Yaounde.  His rights were subsequently purchased by Rainbow Bamenda.

Club career

New York Red Bulls
In early 2015 Abang went on  trial with New York Red Bulls of Major League Soccer. Abang impressed during the 2015 pre-season and on 5 March 2015 the Red Bulls announced that they had completed  Abang's transfer from Rainbow FC. Abang made his professional debut for New York on 8 March 2015 coming on as a second-half substitute in a 1–1 draw at Sporting Kansas City. On 6 June 2015 Abang scored his first goal for the senior team in 4–2 loss versus Houston Dynamo. On 28 June 2015 Abang assisted Chris Duvall on his 52nd-minute goal which helped Red Bulls to a 2–1 lead, in an eventual 3-1 derby victory over New York City FC. A few days later, on 1 July 2015 Abang helped the Red Bulls to a victory in the US Open Cup over local rival New York Cosmos, scoring the go ahead goal in a 4–1 victory. On 1 August 2015 Abang scored New York's final goal in a 3–1 away victory over Philadelphia Union.

Loan to New York Red Bulls II
During the 2015 season Abang was loaned to New York Red Bulls II. On 4 April 2015 in his first match with the team Abang opened the scoring for New York Red Bulls II, scoring the first goal in club history in a 4–1 victory over Toronto FC II. On 18 April 2015 Abang scored the equalising goal for New York Red Bulls II in a 1–1 draw against the Charleston Battery. On 17 May 2015 Abang scored the lone goal for New York Red Bulls II in another 1–1 draw against Charleston Battery. On 24 May 2015 Abang scored New York's opening goal in a 3–2 victory over FC Montreal.

On 10 April 2016 Abang scored his first goal of the season, helping New York Red Bulls II to a 4–0 victory over Bethlehem Steel FC. On 7 May 2016 Abang scored his second goal of the season in 3–1 victory over Pittsburgh Riverhounds.

Loan to Hobro IK
On 22 August 2016, it was announced by Hobro IK that they had acquired Abang on loan for the 2016–17 Danish 1st Division season. While with the club, Abang scored three goals in 10 league matches. The loan deal was cancelled six months before time and Abang went back to New York Red Bulls on 31 January 2017.

Loan to SJK
On 28 March 2017, it was announced by SJK that they had acquired Abang on loan until July 2017. On 10 May 2017, SJK announced that they had terminated Abang's loan deal.

Loan to Astra Giurgiu 
On 9 August 2017, Abang was loaned to the Romanian first division club, FC Astra Giurgiu until July 2018. While with the Romanian side Abang appeared in 29 matches and scored 5 goals.

Nantong Zhiyun
On 19 February 2019, Abang transferred to China League One newcomer Nantong Zhiyun.

Sheriff Tiraspol 
On 6 February 2020, Abang joined FC Sheriff Tiraspol.

Keşla 
On 26 December 2020, Abang signed a one-year contract with Keşla FK. Abang left Keşla at the end of his contract.

International career
Abang has represented Cameroon at the Under-17 level, making his debut with the squad in 2012. He is also a part of Cameroon's Under-20 player pool.

On 10 March 2016, Abang was called up to Cameroon's senior squad for Africa Cup of Nations qualifier against South Africa.

Honors

Club
New York Red Bulls
MLS Supporters' Shield (2): 2015, 2018

Career statistics

International goals
Scores and results list Cameroon's goal tally first.

References

External links
Anatole Abang at New York Red Bulls

 

1996 births
Living people
Footballers from Yaoundé
Cameroonian footballers
Cameroonian expatriate footballers
Cameroon international footballers
Cameroon youth international footballers
Cameroon under-20 international footballers
Association football forwards
Rainbow FC (Cameroon) players
New York Red Bulls players
New York Red Bulls II players
Hobro IK players
Seinäjoen Jalkapallokerho players
FC Astra Giurgiu players
Nantong Zhiyun F.C. players
FC Sheriff Tiraspol players
Shamakhi FK players
Al Bataeh Club players
China League One players
Major League Soccer players
USL Championship players
Danish 1st Division players
Veikkausliiga players
Liga I players
Moldovan Super Liga players
Azerbaijan Premier League players
UAE First Division League players
UAE Pro League players
Expatriate soccer players in the United States
Cameroonian expatriate sportspeople in the United States
Expatriate men's footballers in Denmark
Cameroonian expatriate sportspeople in Denmark
Expatriate footballers in Finland
Cameroonian expatriate sportspeople in Finland
Expatriate footballers in Romania
Cameroonian expatriate sportspeople in Romania
Expatriate footballers in China
Cameroonian expatriate sportspeople in China
Expatriate footballers in Moldova
Cameroonian expatriate sportspeople in Moldova
Expatriate footballers in Azerbaijan
Cameroonian expatriate sportspeople in Azerbaijan
Expatriate footballers in the United Arab Emirates
Cameroonian expatriate sportspeople in the United Arab Emirates